The Bihar Legislative Assembly election was held in three phases through October–November to elect members to the Seventeenth Bihar Legislative Assembly. The term of the previous Sixteenth Legislative Assembly of Bihar ended on 29 November 2020.

The election was held in three phases for a total of 243 seats:- the first for 71 seats on 28 October 2020, the second for 94 seats on 3 November 2020, and the third for the remaining 78 seats on 7 November 2020. The counting of votes began on 10 November 2020 and the incumbent National Democratic Alliance emerged as the winner with 125 elected MLAs, whereas the principal opposition coalition of Mahagathbandhan won 110 seats. Other minor coalitions and parties won 7 seats while only 1 newly elected MLA was an independent.

After the elections, the incumbent Chief Minister Nitish Kumar was elected as the leader of the National Democratic Alliance in Bihar and was sworn in again as Chief Minister, whereas two new deputy Chief Ministers, Tarkishore Prasad and Renu Devi were inducted to the new ministry. On the other side, Tejashwi Yadav was elected Leader of the Opposition, and also leader of the Mahagathbandhan alliance.
Later Vijay Kumar Sinha was elected the new Speaker of the Bihar Legislative Assembly.

Background
Outlined in Article 168 of the Constitution of India, the Bihar Legislative Assembly is the lower house of the bicameral legislature of Bihar and not a permanent body and subject to dissolution. The tenure of the Legislative Assembly is five years from the date appointed for its first sitting unless dissolved sooner. Members of the Legislative Assembly are directly elected by the people. The Tenure  of current Bihar Legislative Assembly is scheduled to end on 29 November 2020.

In the previous election, an alliance of three Major Parties  consisting of Janata Dal (United), Rashtriya Janata Dal and Indian National Congress named as Mahagathbandhan won against its primary opposition, the Bharatiya Janata Party led National Democratic Alliance. However, in 2017, the Janata Dal (United) Chief Minister Nitish Kumar left the Mahagathbandhan and joined the National Democratic Alliance. While Nitish Kumar remained the Chief Minister, Sushil Kumar Modi of the Bharatiya Janata Party replaced Tejashwi Yadav as the Deputy Chief Minister.

Issues
The main issue was that of the jobs and the economy. Bihar, for a long time, has been an economically backward state and sends large numbers of migrant laborers to cities across the country. Due to the coronavirus pandemic lockdown, thousands of migrant laborers were forced to return to their home states due to lack of work, and Bihar was one of the most affected by the ensuing humanitarian crisis. Many of these workers blamed the current government for not having jobs for them in the first place, and not providing jobs when the lockdown started. There was also a significant anti-incumbency wave against Nitish, who had been CM for 15 years.

The three agriculture bills passed by the Indian Parliament amid nationwide protests was expected to play a key role in the elections.

Issues such as the lack of employment, alleged politicisation of flood relief in the aftermath of the 2019 Bihar floods and alleged inability of the state government to handle the COVID-19 pandemic were expected to be made an election issue by the opposition parties. The limited digital connectivity in Bihar and the migrant crisis were among the issues which may have had an impact on campaigning and poll outcomes.

The death of the former Lok Janshakti Party president and union cabinet minister, Ram Vilas Paswan on 8 October 2020 was also speculated to have an effect on the prospects of the competing parties.
It was reported that the BJP accorded special focus on the politically significant Mithila region which comprises 22 of the 38 districts of the state including Darbhanga, Madhubani, Supaul, Araria, Purnia, Katihar and Samastipur.

Schedule
On 25 September,  Election Commission of India announced the dates for Bihar Assembly elections.

Parties and Alliances

National Democratic Alliance 
The National Democratic Alliance in Bihar is the ruling political group headed by the chief minister Nitish Kumar and comprising primarily the Janata Dal (United) and the Bharatiya Janata Party in the legislative assembly.

In the previous election, the alliance was led by the Bharatiya Janata Party alongside three smaller allies namely the Lok Janshakti Party, the Rashtriya Lok Samta Party and the Hindustani Awam Morcha, while the Janata Dal (United) had contested as part of the current opposition Mahagathbandan. In 2017, the Janata Dal (United) switched alliance which caused the Mahagathbandan government to fall and the National Democratic Alliance came to power. In 2018, two of the partners, the Rashtriya Lok Samata Party and the Hindustani Awam Morcha left the alliance.

During the campaigning phase in August 2020, the alliance was re-joined by the Hindustani Awam Morcha which held one seat in the legislature. Later, the alliance was also joined in by the Vikassheel Insaan Party in October 2020. The campaign however faced problems with persistent attacks on the Janata Dal (United) by the Lok Janshakti Party. Chirag Paswan, the leader of the party in the state was called to Delhi to negotiate with the national leadership of the Bharatiya Janata Party, in the end the Lok Janshakti Party quit the alliance stating that they would contest all seats against the Janata Dal (United) but not against the Bharatiya Janata Party. Following the development, several notable leader of the Bharatiya Janata Party including the state vice president and 2 sitting legislators joined the Lok Janshakti Party to contest against Janata Dal (United) candidates. Later during the campaigning period in October 2020, the Bharatiya Janata Party officially cut ties with the Lok Janshakti Party stating that the National Democratic Alliances in Bihar consisted of the four parties.

According to political analysts the Lok Janshakti Party was unlikely to make any electoral gains but would act as spoilers for the Janata Dal (United) candidates, the development was suggested to have been orchestrated by the Bharatiya Janata Party to gain leverage over the Janata Dal (United) by reducing its final tally. The Bharatiya Janata Party at the time re-asserted that Nitish Kumar would remain the chief ministerial face of the alliance.

Both the Lok Janshakti Party and the Janata Dal (United) are expected to hold sway among certain sections of Scheduled caste voters while the Bharatiya Janta Party are expected to draws its support base from Forward caste voters.

The Janata Dal (United) though relied upon its core voters by giving importance to its Luv-Kush equation in ticket distribution, also gave good representation to the forward castes and EBCs. For 115 seats which it contested 17 forward caste were given party tickets while the Koeri and Kurmi candidates got 17 and 7 seats respectively. The EBCs on the other hand contested on 21 seats out of 115.

Mahagathbandhan 
The Mahagathbandhan is the main opposition political coalition comprising primarily the United Progressive Alliance members Rashtriya Janata Dal and Indian National Congress along with left–wing parties such as CPI and CPI (M).

In the previous election, the Mahagathbandhan formed and initially comprised the Rashtriya Janata Dal, the Janata Dal (United) and the Indian National Congress. It was able to form government following the election but the government fell when the Janata Dal (United) switched sides and joined the National Democratic Alliance. In the opposition, the alliance was joined in by smaller parties like the Rashtriya Lok Samta Party, the Hindustan Awami Morcha and the Vikassheel Insaan Party. The three parties however opted out of the alliance between August–October 2020. In September 2020, the Samajwadi Party which had contested in previous elections in Bihar without success, declared that they would not contest this time and instead support the Rashtriya Janata Dal.

In the meantime, the alliance after negotiations were joined in by the left–wing parties in Bihar; namely the Communist Party of India (Marxist–Leninist) Liberation, the Communist Party of India and the Communist Party of India (Marxist). The new arrangement was described as an experiment beyond the caste based politics in Bihar with a caste plus class strategy. The communist parties in Bihar had historically held a large presence in the state that was reduced following the Mandal Commission, the Liberation group had retained some of its former base and had emerged as the largest non alliance party in the previous election.

The seat sharing agreement was finalised on 3 October 2020 with the Jharkhand Mukti Morcha included in the alliance. On 7 October, the Jharkhand Mukti Morcha opted out of the alliance in Bihar over disagreements on seat sharing while maintaining that they will continue to uphold their alliance in the state of Jharkhand.

Grand Democratic Secular Front
In the wake of the 2020 Bihar Legislative Assembly election, Upendra Kushwaha pulled the party out of the Rashtriya Janata Dal led Mahagathbandhan (Grand Alliance),. The party entered into an alliance with the Uttar Pradesh based Bahujan Samaj Party and the minor Janvadi Party (Socialist); The UDSA consisted of the Samajwadi Janata Dal Democratic led by the veteran socialist Devendra Prasad Yadav and the All India Majlis-e-Ittehadul Muslimeen. On 8 October 2020, the UDSA and the three party front including the Bahujan Samaj Party were merged into a single coalition called the Grand Democratic Secular Front (GDSF), the alliance additionally included the Suheldev Bharatiya Samaj Party. Among the constituent parties, only the All India Majlis-e-Ittehadul Muslimeen had representation in the assembly through a single legislator.

Others 
There are a number of other smaller parties and coalitions contesting the election, the prospects and impact of these formations have been noted to be marginal. As of January 2020, there were 120 unrecognised registered parties in Bihar.

On 2 October 2020, there were reportedly four other noteworthy alliances that had emerged; Progressive Democratic Alliance (PDA), United Democratic Alliance (UDA). PDA consisted of Pappu Yadav's Jan Adhikar Party, Chandrashekhar Azad's Azad Samaj Party, Social Democratic Party of India and Bahujan Mukti Party. The UDA consisted of a front of 20 parties collectively led by the former Bharatiya Janata Party cabinet minister Yashwant Sinha and other transiently popular mass leaders. 
The newly formed The Plurals Party (TPP, दप्पा) is also contesting the election in 2020 on all 243 seats.

In the meantime, the UDA which was the front led by Yashwant Sinha had reportedly fallen apart as various members of the constituent parties had defected to join the mainstream regional and national parties. Other notable parties that are contesting independent of an alliance, are the Lok Janshakti Party on 134 seats, the Loktantrik Janata Dal on 51 seats, the Shiv Sena on 30–40 seats and the Jharkhand Mukti Morcha on 7 seats.

Candidates

Surveys and polls

Seat projections

Vote Share

Election

The Chief Election Commissioner of India, Sunil Arora, announced on 25 September 2020 that the Bihar assembly election will be held from 28 October 2020, in three phases for 243 constituencies. Per the Election Commission of India, approximately 60 registered parties  are to contest in the Bihar elections.

The elections were conducted amid the COVID-19 pandemic with the necessary guidelines issued by the Election Commission of India. The election will consist of both, virtual and physical campaigns. The authorities also passed the guidelines over limited people to be involved in the rallies. Due to COVID-19, the polling time will be increased by one hour and will now be from 7am to 6pm, except in Naxalite–Maoist insurgency affected areas. As per guidelines, maximum number of voters per polling station was reduced from 1,500 to 1,000. Arrangements were made for 7 lakh units of hand sanitisers, 46 lakh masks, 6 lakh PPE kits, 6.7 lakh face shields, and 23 lakh single use gloves.

Voting
The overall voter turnout in this election has been 57.05%, which is 0.39% more than the 56.66% in 2015 assembly polls. In these elections, 59.58% of females voted compared to a 54.68% voter turnout of males.

Phase 1

A total of 1,066 candidates, including 952 male and 114 female, contested in the first phase of elections from different constituencies. The maximum number of candidates contesting from one constituency in the first phase was being at Gaya Town with 27 candidates and the minimum at Katoria with 5 candidates in Banka district. In the constituencies voting in the first phase of elections, approximately 2.15 crore registered electors were eligible to exercise their vote, out of which around 1.12 crore were male, 1.01 crore were female and 599 were categorised as the third gender.

The first phase of elections recorded a voter turnout of 55.68%. The male and female voter turnout for the first phase was 56.8% and 54.4% respectively. In the previous assembly election in 2015, the voter turnout was 54.94% for these constituencies.

Phase 2

In the second phase of elections, 1463 candidates contested the elections, of which 1315 candidates were male, 147 candidates were female and 1 candidate belonged to the transgender community.

The elections was held on 3 November. Voter turnout for the 2nd phase was over 55.7%.

Phase 3
In the third phase of elections,  1094 male candidates and 110 female candidates contested the elections for 78 Seats, out of a total of 23.5 Million eligible voters for this phase total of 12.3 Million were Male and 11.2 Million were female voters.

The elections were held on 7 November 2020 and the total Voting turnout was recorded 59.94%, which was highest among all three phases.

Incidents
On 27 October 2020 a day before the first phase of the election, three improvised explosive devices (IEDs) were recovered and diffused from two different places in Imamganj area of Gaya district.

Results

Summary

NDA secured a total of 125 seats (37.26% votes) while MGB won 110 seats (37.23% votes). GDSF got 6 seats, LJP & others won a seat each. The results surprised many analysts and polling agencies that predicted MGB to win.  Only agency to correctly predict the Bihar election results was Politique Marquer that had predicted a narrow majority for NDA. Rashtriya Janata Dal won in 75 constituencies and became the largest political party in the Legislative Assembly, however its numbers reduced compared to previous election. The Bharatiya Janata Party won 74 seats and was the biggest gainer in terms of number of MLAs elected as it added more than 30% to its seat count compared to the last election. The Janata Dal (United) and Indian National Congress won in 43 and 19 constituencies respectively and dropped the most seats compared to the previous election. The All India Majlis-e-Ittehadul Muslimeen (AIMIM) also made inroads in the state winning 5 seats. All the 5 MLAs of AIMIM were elected from constituencies in the  Seemanchal region of the State. The Communist parties also gained in these elections. The Communist Party of India (Marxist–Leninist) (Liberation) won 12 seats, whereas the Communist Party of India (Marxist) and Communist Party of India won 2 seats each. The Vikassheel Insaan Party which contested the Assembly elections for the first time won 4 seats. Sumit Kumar Singh was the only Independent candidate to win as a MLA.

The constituencies with higher female turnout than male, the NDA was in lead. Out of the 125 seats that NDA won, 99 were constituencies where female turnout was more than their male counterparts. About 20% of the seats, the margin of victory was less than 2.5% of the votes polled. The NDA won 21 seats with a less than 2.5% vote margin, while the Mahagathbandhan won in 22 such seats.

Results by District Wise
In districts adjoining Uttar Pradesh, the BJP performed better than the Mahagathbandhan, however JDU's seats declined. The NDA won in majority of the constituencies in the Champaran region.

Results by Constituency

Aftermath

Government formation 

After the election process concluded, Chief Minister Nitish Kumar tendered his resignation to the Governor on 13 November 2020. The National Democratic Alliance members met at around 12:30 pm IST, on 15 November to formally announce and elect the new Chief Minister. Nitish Kumar was elected leader of the NDA and Chief Minister in the meeting. After being elected as the NDA leader in Bihar, Nitish said that he did not want to become the chief minister of the state and wanted someone from the BJP party to become the next chief minister. However he accepted the designation on the insistence of the BJP. Soon after, Nitish visited the Governor to stake claim to form the new government.

Reactions and analysis
After the election results were announced, the incumbent Chief Minister of Bihar Nitish Kumar thanked the Prime Minister of India Narendra Modi for his contribution and support to the National Democratic Alliance in the election campaign. Narendra Modi himself declared victory and quoted “Democracy has once again won in Bihar.”

Following the results, Tejashwi claimed to have "won 130 seats" and that "the mandate was in our favour, but the Election Commission’s results were declared in favour of NDA". He claimed, that the MGB "lost about 20 seats" because of "irregularities" in counting of postal ballots and threatened to move to court. The partisan Election Commission termed the claims unfounded, adding that, according to Bharatiya Janata Party's procedure, the postal ballots including the invalid ones were re-verified where the margin of victory was less than the number of rejected ballots. Tejashwi also claimed that NDA won by "money, muscle power and deceit". Later the Election Commission claimed that it had counted random voter-verified paper audit trail which matched the EVM count.

The Time magazine called the victory as a triumph for Modi's "Hindu Nationalist Message". According to analysts BJP has become more significant in the state than before. The 14th Dalai Lama congratulated Nitish on his election victory.

Bye-election
2021 bye-election was necessitated by the death of sitting MLAs of Kusheshwar Asthan and Tarapur assembly constituencies. JDU was successful in holding on to both the seats.

2022 bye election: RJD gained Bochahan seat of Muzzafarpur district and LS constituency from BJP.

BJP gained Kudhni seat of Muzaffarpur district and LS constituency from RJD.

See also

 2020 elections in India

References

Notes

Citations

External links
Official Election Commission - Bihar
Bihar Election Results ECI

2020 Bihar Legislative Assembly election
2020s in Bihar
State Assembly elections in Bihar